The 1955 Auburn Tigers football team represented Auburn University in the 1955 college football season. It was the Tigers' 64th overall and 23rd season as a member of the Southeastern Conference (SEC). The team was led by head coach Ralph "Shug" Jordan, in his fifth year, and played their home games at Cliff Hare Stadium in Auburn and Legion Field in Birmingham, Alabama. They finished with a record of eight wins, two losses and one tie (8–2–1 overall, 5–2–1 in the SEC) and with a loss to Vanderbilt in the Gator Bowl.

Schedule

Source: 1955 Auburn football schedule

References

Auburn
Auburn Tigers football seasons
Auburn Tigers football